Oberweißbach (or Oberweissbach) is a town and a former municipality in the district of Saalfeld-Rudolstadt, in Thuringia, Germany. Since 1 January 2019, it is part of the town Schwarzatal.

Geography 
It is a nationally recognized resort town in the Thuringian Forest Nature Park in the Weißbachtal.

It was the seat of the former municipal administration Bergbahnregion/Schwarzatal with communities of Cursdorf, Deesbach, Katzhütte, Oberweißbach and Meuselbach-Schwarzmühle. On 1 December 2008, Oberweißbach incorporated the former municipality Lichtenhain/Bergbahn. Colloquially this area is called Raanz, based on the primary transportation method of the pharmacists, the backpack. These pharmacists shaped this region between the 16th and 20th centuries.

The town of Oberweißbach consisted of two districts:
 Oberweißbach / Thüringer Wald and
 Lichtenhain/Bergbahn.

Notable people 
Rudolph Beyer, Socialist glassblower and state senator in Milwaukee - born in Oberweißbach
Friedrich Fröbel, teacher and creator of the concept of the kindergarten - born in Oberweißbach
Michèle Kiesewetter, police officer murdered by neo-Nazis - born in Oberweißbach

References

External links

Saalfeld-Rudolstadt
Schwarzburg-Rudolstadt
Former municipalities in Thuringia